The Ganden Tripa, also spelled Gaden Tripa ( "Holder of the Ganden Throne"), is the title of the spiritual leader of the Gelug school of Tibetan Buddhism, the school that controlled central Tibet from the mid-17th century until the 1950s. The 103rd Ganden Tripa, Jetsun Lobsang Tenzin died in office on 21 April 2017. Currently, Jangtse Choejey Kyabje Jetsun Lobsang Tenzin Palsangpo is the 104th Ganden Tripa.

The head of the Gelugpa order is the Ganden Tripa and not, as is often misunderstood, the Dalai Lama. It is also often misunderstood that the Ganden Tripa is the same person as the abbot of Ganden monastery. Ganden has two abbots, the abbot of Ganden Shartse and the abbot of Ganden Jangtse, and neither of them can be the Ganden Tripa unless they have also served as abbot of Gyumay or Gyuto tantric colleges. See 'Mode of Appointment' below.

The Ganden Tripa is an appointed office, not a reincarnation lineage.  It is awarded on the basis of merit which is the basis of his hierarchical progression.  Since the position is held for only a 7-year term, there have been many more Ganden Tripas than Dalai Lamas to date (102 as against 14).

Je Tsongkhapa (1357–1419), who founded the Gelug, is the first Ganden Tripa. After Tsongkhapa's death, his teachings were held and kept by Gyaltsab Je and Khedrub Je who were the next abbots of Ganden monastery. The lineage has been held by the Ganden Tripas.

In January 2003, the Central Tibetan Administration announced the nomination of the 101st Ganden Tripa.  An excerpt from that press release gives his background:

The 100th Ganden Tripa, Lobsang Nyima Rinpoche,  retired and lived at Drepung Loselling Monastery with his labrang (office staff) until his death in 2008.

Mode of appointment

The Ganden Tripa is nominated or appointed on the basis of a hierarchical progression based on merit, and the appointee does not necessarily have to have any direct connection with Ganden Monastery, although if he started as a Ganden monk he could have obtained his higher Geshe degree there and risen to be its abbot.

There is a traditional Tibetan saying: “If a beggar’s child has the ability, there is no stopping him becoming the Throne Holder of Ganden.” It means the post is obtained on merit alone, rather than by recognition as the incarnation of a teacher, or other means.

This, and the hierarchy through which any Gelugpa monk can rise up through the ranks on merit to become the Ganden Tripa is briefly described in the November 2011 edition of Me-Long, a journal published by the Norbulingka Institute, which is dedicated to the preservation of the Tibetan culture, and in full detail on "Study Buddhism". The progression can be summarised as follows: first of all, a monk of any Gelugpa monastery, who, after usually 15 to 20 years of study, achieves a Tsorampa or Lharampa (higher) Geshe degree, is obliged to enter either the Gyuto Tantric College or the Gyume Tantric College, depending on his place of origin in Tibet, to continue his studies. If, after one or two years further study he then qualifies as Ngagrampa Geshe, he can rise on merit to become a Geko or disciplinarian, then to become vice-abbot (tenure 3 years); then he can be chosen and appointed by the Dalai Lama as abbot of his respective college, with a tenure of a further 3 years.

On retirement as Abbot of Gyume or Gyuto, he becomes eligible to become, eventually, for former Gyume abbots the Jangtsey Chojey ("Dharma Master of the Northern Peak of Ganden Hill"), or for former Gyuto abbots the Sharpa Chojey ("Dharma Master of the Eastern Peak of Ganden Hill"). These are more elevated positions, above abbots and retired abbots, which are automatically accorded only to the senior-most surviving retired abbot, one from each respective college, with a tenure of 7 years.

The Ganden Tripa is an automatic appointment occurring once every 7 years, from one or the other of these two Chojeys or Dharma Masters, on an alternating basis. The incumbent Ganden Tripa stands down, and one of the two Chojeys is elevated. If the retiring Ganden Tripa is a former abbot of Gyume Tantric College, and thus a former Jangtsey Chojey, his replacement will be a former abbot of Gyuto Tantric College and thus the current Sharpa Chojey (and vice versa).

This appointment is automatic but is apparently confirmed by the Dalai Lama who, being the pre-eminent spiritual leader, publicly announces the appointment or nomination at the time of changeover. The Rizong Sre Rinpoche was the 102nd Ganden Tripa, he previously served as the abbot of both Gyume Tantric College and Drepung Loseling Monastery.

List of Ganden Tripas

1–25

26–50

51–75

76–102

References

External links
 Tibetan Buddhist Resource Center

Religious leadership roles
Politics of Tibet
Tibetan Buddhist titles
 
Gelug Lamas
History of Lhasa